The Congregation of Georgian Jews is an Orthodox synagogue at 6304 Yellowstone Boulevard, in the Forest Hills neighborhood of Queens, New York.  The members are late twentieth century immigrants from the Republic of Georgia.

History

The synagogue building was made possible by a donation from the Georgian Jewish philanthropist, Tamir Sapir.

When the Republic of Georgia released a postage stamp honoring the nineteenth century Rabbi Abraam Khvoles, the unveiling ceremony was held at the synagogue by Revaz Adamia, representative of Georgia to the United Nations.

During the August 2008 Russian invasion of Georgia, U.S. Rep. Anthony Weiner held an  emergency meeting for the entire Georgian community in New York, Christian and Jewish, at the Congregation because the synagogue is the only large, monumental structure built by Georgians in New York City.

Current leadership
, the Senior Rabbi is Avraham Ashville, and the Rabbi and youth director is Aharon Chein.

References

External links

Congregation of Georgian Jews website

European-American culture in New York City
Forest Hills, Queens
Georgian-Jewish culture in the United States
Orthodox synagogues in New York City
Mizrahi Jewish culture in the United States
Sephardi Jewish culture in New York City
Sephardi synagogues
Synagogues in Queens, New York